Evert is a Dutch and Swedish short form of the Germanic masculine name "Everhard" (alternative Eberhard).  It is also used as surname.

Notable people with the name include:

Given name
Evert van Aelst (1602–1657), Dutch still life painter
Evert Andersen (1772–1809), Norwegian naval officer
Evert Augustus Duyckinck (1816–1878), American publisher and biographer
Evert Azimullah (born 1938), Surinamese diplomat, politician, and writer
Evert Båge (1925–2021), Swedish Air Force major general
Evert Jan Baerends (born 1945), Dutch theoretical chemist
Evert Bancker (mayor) (1665–1734), New Netherland/New York trader and politician
Evert Bancker (speaker) (1721–1803), New York merchant and politician
Evert Bastet (born 1950), Canadian sailor
Evert van Benthem (born 1958), Dutch speed skater
Evert Willem Beth (1908–1964), Dutch philosopher and logician
Evert Björn (1888–1974), Swedish middle-distance runner
Evert Bloemsma (1958–2005), Dutch type designer and graphic designer
Evert Jan Boks (1838–1914), Dutch painter
Evert Jan Brill (1812–1871), Dutch publisher
Evert Brouwers (born 1990), Dutch footballer
Evert Bulder (1894–1973), Dutch footballer
Evert Collier (1642–1708), Dutch painter
Evert Dolman (1946–1993), Dutch racing cyclist
Evert Dudok (born 1959), Dutch engineer and CEO
Evert Eloranta (1879–1936), Finnish politician
Evert Endt (born 1933), Dutch-born French designer
Evert Geradts (born 1943), Dutch cartoonist
Evert Grift (1922–2009), Dutch racing cyclist
Evert Groenewald (fl. 1963–1999), South African Navy officer
Evert Gunnarsson (born 1929), Swedish rower
Evert Hingst (1969–2005), Dutch lawyer and murder victim
Evert Hoek (born 1933), South African-Canadian civil engineer
Evert-Jan 't Hoen (born 1975), Dutch baseball player
Evert Hokkanen (1864–1918), Finnish farmworker and politician
Evert Horn (1585–1615), Swedish soldier
Evert Hoving (born 1953), Dutch middle-distance runner
Evert Huttunen (1884–1924), Finnish journalist and politician
Evert Jakobsson (1886–1960), Finnish javelin thrower
Evert Johansson (1903–1990), Finnish canoeist 
Evert Kamerbeek (1934–2008), Dutch decathlete
Evert Karlsson (1920–1996), Swedish ski jumper
Evert Koops (1885–1938), Dutch sprinter
Evert Kroes (born 1950), Dutch rower
Evert Kroon (born 1946), Dutch water polo goalkeeper
Evert Johan Kroon (born 1966), Netherlands Antilles swimmer
Evert Kulenius (1879–1958), Finnish schoolteacher and politician
Evert Larock (1865–1901), Belgian painter
Évert Lengua (born 1983), Peruvian footballer
Evert van Linge (1895–1964), Dutch footballer
Evert Lundquist (1904–1994), Swedish painter and graphic artist
Evert Lundqvist (1900–1979), Swedish footballer
Evert van Milligen (born 1948), Dutch VVD politician
Evert Musch (1918–2007), Dutch painter
Evert van Muyden (1853–1922), Swiss engraver, illustrator and painter
Evert Nilsson (1894–1973), Swedish pentathlete and decathlete
Evert Nyberg (1925–2000), Swedish long-distance runner
Evert Oudendijck (1650–1695), Dutch painter
Evert Pieters (1856–1932), Dutch painter
Evert Ploeg (born 1963), Australian portrait painter.
Evert Skoglund (born 1953), Italian footballer
Evert V. Snedecker (1838–1899), American racing horse trainer and owner
Evert Sodergren (1920–2013), American studio furniture maker
Evert Sparks (1879–1972), Canadian (Alberta) politician
Evert Taube (1890–1976), Swedish author, artist, composer and singer
Evert Verbist (born 1984), Belgian road cyclist
Evert Verwey (1905–1981), Dutch chemist
Evert Ysbrandszoon Ides (1657–1708), Danish traveller and diplomat

Surname
Alexei Evert (1857–1926), General in the Russian Empire
Angelos Evert (1894–1970), Greek police officer
Chris Evert (born 1954), American tennis player
Evert Cup, women's tennis tournament named after her
Chris Evert (horse), racing horse named after her
James Evert (1924–2015), American tennis coach, father of Chris and Jeanne
Jason Evert (born 1975), Catholic author and chastity speaker
Jeanne Evert (1957–2020), American tennis player
Miltiadis Evert (1939–2011), Greek politician

See also
Everett (surname)
Everts (surname)

References

Dutch masculine given names
Swedish masculine given names
Surnames from given names